Helge Hansen (24 February 1925 – 22 January 2008) was a Danish cyclist. He competed in the individual and team road race events at the 1952 Summer Olympics.

References

External links
 

1925 births
2008 deaths
Danish male cyclists
Olympic cyclists of Denmark
Cyclists at the 1952 Summer Olympics
People from Kongens Lyngby
Sportspeople from the Capital Region of Denmark